Masterplan is the German power metal band Masterplan's self-titled debut album, released in 2003 by AFM Records. The album received many good reviews and entered the charts at high positions.  The album was voted album of the month in Sweden Rock Magazine, Rock Hard and Heavy, Oder Was?! in Germany and Metal Factory in Switzerland. The band received the "European Border Breakers Award" in 2004 from the European Commission, for the album sales around Europe.

By the time their first full-length and self-titled CD was released in 2003, keyboard player Janne "Warman" Wirman was replaced by Axel Mackenrott. Wirman recorded some session keyboards for the album, but could not stay on as a full-time member due to his commitments to Children of Bodom. The main keyboard lines of the album were arranged and programmed by Grapow and Kusch. Missing a proper bass player, Grapow recorded the bass parts, with some help from session bassist Jürgen Attig (Casanova). Permanent bassist Jan-Sören Eckert joined shortly after the album's release. Despite not playing on the album, Mackenrott and Eckert both appear in the album sleeve.

Michael Kiske, the former Helloween bandmate of guitarist Roland Grapow, duets on track "Heroes".

Reception 
In 2005, Masterplan was ranked number 491 in Rock Hard magazine's book The 500 Greatest Rock & Metal Albums of All Time.

Track listing 
All songs were written by Masterplan, except where noted.

Personnel 
 Jørn Lande – vocals
 Roland Grapow – guitar, bass, keyboards arrangement and program
 Uli Kusch – drums, keyboards arrangement and program

Guest musicians
 Michael Kiske – vocals on track 6
 Janne Wirman – keyboards on all tracks
 Ferdy Doernberg – keyboards on track 8
 Jürgen Attig – bass on B-sides
Production
 Produced by Andy Sneap and Masterplan
 Recorded by Andy Sneap at Crazy Cat Studio, Hamburg (GER)
 Mixed by Mikko Karmila at Finnvox Studio, Helsinki (FIN)
 Mastered by Mika Jussila at Finnvox Studio, Helsinki (FIN)
 Bandphotos by Dirk Schelpmeier
 Artwork and booklet design by Rainer Laws
 Album cover and band logo by Thomas Ewerhard

Singles

Enlighten Me 

"Enlighten Me" is the first single by Masterplan, taken from the present album. Despite the band picture on the sleeve, all keyboards are played by Janne Warman, and Jürgen Attig plays bass on tracks 3 and 4, with Grapow playing the bass on the remaining three tracks.

Led Zeppelin's "Black Dog" cover was included on The Music Remains the Same: A Tribute to Led Zeppelin, a tribute album by Locomotive Music (Spain).

References 

2003 debut albums
Masterplan (band) albums
AFM Records albums
Albums produced by Andy Sneap
European Border Breakers Award-winning albums